Maanselkä or Maanselka is a hilly region in Finland and Russia. It is located at the northern end of the East European Plain, around the Arctic Circle. 

The Urho Kekkonen National Park, Oulanka National Park and Paanajärvi National Park are protected areas partly located in the Maanselkä hills. The main economic activities of the area are skiing, forestry, reindeer herding, hunting, as well as fishing in the lakes and rivers.

Geography
Maanselkä is an extensive chain of smooth hills forming a watershed that separates the rivers flowing into the Baltic Sea from those flowing into the White Sea of the Arctic Ocean. It is located in northeastern Finland, in the eastern parts of North Ostrobothnia and Lapland, by the Russian border. In Russia the southern part of the range is in Karelia and the northern in Murmansk Oblast. To the northwest the drainage divide extends further into northern Norway. 

The hills are low and rounded.
There are many lakes in the intermontane basins, as well as rivers with poorly drained valleys and swampy forests. The highest elevations are treeless and barren, with some mountain tundra vegetation.

Geologically Maanselkä is part of the central zone of the Baltic Shield. There are numerous traces of the erosional activity of ancient glaciers across the hills, such as lateral moraines and outwash plains.

See also
Highest points of Russian Federal subjects
List of mountains and hills of Russia

References

External links

Studies on the vegetational history of the Kuusamo district (North East Finland) during the Late-quaternary period.
Vuokrataan­ko tunturi Neuvosto­liitosta? Kylmän sodan Kuu­samos­sa heräsi en­nak­ko­luu­loton hanke - Suomalaiset halusivat vuokrata tunturin ja tehdä alueelle viisumivapaan matkailukohteen.

Mountains of Finland
Landforms of the Republic of Karelia
Landforms of Lapland (Finland)
Mountains of Murmansk Oblast